

Summary

Legend
TS — Team sprint
KE — Keirin
SP — Sprint
TP — Team pursuit
IP — Individual pursuit
MA — Madison
PR — Points race
RR — Road race
TT — Individual time trial
Q — Quotas
R — Riders

Qualification timeline

Track
A National Olympic Committee (NOC) may enter up to 2 athletes in each individual event, except points race where it can enter only 1 athlete. NOC may also enter up to 1 team in each team event.

Champions in the World Championship, World Cup, and "B" World Championship automatically qualify (Nontransferable place), as do several of the athletes with the highest UCI rankings in their event on 30 March 2008. Additionally, the tripartite commission (made up of the IOC, UCI and ANOC) may issue invitational places.

Men's sprint

* Since World Cup leader qualified through World Championships, the next competitor from the world rankings qualify.

** South Africa replaced by the next competitor from the world rankings

Men's pursuit

* Since World Cup leader qualified through World Championships, the next competitor from the world rankings qualify.

Men's points

* Bulgaria replaced by the next competitor from the world rankings

Women

Road 
An NOC may enter up to 5 men and 3 women if qualified through the UCI ranking. Otherwise it may enter up to 2 men and 2 women.
Each NOC will receive athlete quota places according to the UCI ranking by nations in the tours. Also, each NOC with a rider in individual ranking in the Pro Tour and in the corresponding top places in continental tours will receive 1 place if not qualified through Nations Ranking.
Places for the time trial event are included in the total quota for cycling disciplines. Only riders involved in the road, track or mountain biking or BMX can take part in the individual time trial race.

Men's road race

* Teams could qualify only the number of riders that they have in the corresponding tour. Luxembourg only qualified 3 riders in the pro tour. The left over places were taken by teams from the "B" World Championships.

** In tours where individual riders qualified, the teams that qualified more than one athlete lost quota places in order to maintain the overall quotas. Sweden, Tunisia, Venezuela, Mexico and Hong Kong all lost 1 quota place to China, Libya, Costa Rica, Cuba and South Korea respectively.

*** Portugal had 3 quota places, but chose to use only two.

**** Switzerland had 2 quota places, but chose to use only one.

Men's individual time trial

Women's road race

* As other quota places are awarded to ranked athletes, the quota places for the ranked NOCs will be decreased to keep the total number of athletes constant.

** Austria, China and Spain had 3 quota places, but chose to use only two.

Women's individual time trial

Mountainbike 
An NOC may enter up to 3 men and 2 women athletes.

Men 

* Since both Australia and New Zealand (the only competitors in the Oceania continental championships) qualified through world rankings, the next two competitors from the world rankings (Hungary and Turkey) qualified a single rider.

** Austria had 2 quota places, but chose to use only one and the next competitor from the world rankings (Japan) qualified a single rider

Women

BMX 
An NOC may enter up to 3 men and 2 women if qualified through the UCI ranking. Otherwise it may enter up to 1 man and 1 woman.

Men 

* New Zealand had 2 quota places, but chose to use only one.

** The left over places were taken by teams from the World Championships.

Women 

* New Zealand had 2 quota places, but chose to use only one.

** The left over places were taken by teams from the World Championships.

References 
Qualifications for Men's Road events at the Olympic Games
2008 Olympic Games road cycling: distribution of places for Elite Women
Mountain bike: publication of rankings by nation and qualification for the Olympic Games
Qualification for track events at the Olympic Games
BMX: Qualifying places awarded for the 2008 Beijing Olympic Games

Notes 

Qualification for the 2008 Summer Olympics
Cycling qualification for the Summer Olympics